Celastrus, commonly known as staff vine, staff tree or bittersweet, is a genus in the family Celastraceae which comprises about 30-40 species of shrubs and vines. They have a wide distribution in East Asia, Australasia, Africa, and the Americas.

The flowers are small, white, pink or greenish, and borne in long panicles; the fruit is a three-valved berry.

In North America, they are known as bittersweet, presumably a result of confusion with the unrelated bittersweet (Solanum dulcamara) by early colonists. C. orbiculatus is a serious invasive weed in much of eastern North America.

Selected species
Celastrus angulatus Maxim. – Chinese staff vine
Celastrus australis  – Australian staff vine
Celastrus dispermus  – orange boxwood
Celastrus flagellaris Rupr.
Celastrus gemmatus Loes.
Celastrus hindsii Benth.
Celastrus monospermus Roxb.
Celastrus orbiculatus Thunb. – Oriental bittersweet
Celastrus paniculatus Willd. - peng
Celastrus pyracanthus  – South African staff vine
Celastrus rosthornianus Loes.
Celastrus scandens L. – American bittersweet
Celastrus stylosus Wall.
Celastrus vaniotii (H.Lév.) Rehder

References

Celastraceae
Celastrales genera